Pasajero may refer to:
 Pasajero (Gipsy Kings album), 2006
 Pasajero (Ari Borovoy album), 2008